Kevin Philip Kelley (born June 29, 1967) is an American former professional boxer who competed from 1988 to 2009, and held the WBC featherweight title from 1993 to 1995.

Amateur career
Kelley won two New York Golden Gloves Championships as well as the 1985 119 lb Sub-Novice Championship and the 1986 119 lb Open Championship. In 1988 Kelley advanced to the finals of the 125 lb Open division and was to have met Fred Liberatore in the finals. Kelley was injured and could not fight. Liberatore was declared the Champion by Default-Injury.

In the Olympic box-offs he lost to Carl Daniels. His record was 70-5.

Professional career

WBC featherweight champion
Known as the "Flushing Flash", Kelley held the WBC Featherweight title and defended it until he lost by TKO to, Mexican Alejandro Martín González, after Kelley failed to come out for the 11th round due to both eyes swollen shut.  Kelley won the title by defeating Gregorio Vargas by unanimous decision in 1993.

Kelley was then signed to an HBO contract, and remained in title contention for the next decade. More known for being in big fights rather than gaining big victories, Kelley's resume includes TKO losses to boxing legends  Prince Naseem Hamed and Marco Antonio Barrera and Erik Morales, both of which came during Kelley's career decline.

Loss to Hamed

Kelley's defeats include losses to Naseem Hamed. In 1997 Hamed flew to the United States to fight there for the first time. His ceremonious arrival on the British Airways Concorde was covered by multiple media outlets. There, he and former two-time WBC Featherweight champion of the world Kevin Kelley fought in Ring Magazine's fight of the year at the Madison Square Garden in New York. Despite being dropped three times himself, Hamed put Kelley down for a third and final time to win by a fourth-round knockout. This was his first of many fights on HBO. The fight was ranked 100th in Channel 4's 100 Greatest Sporting Moments in 2002.

Kelley knocked out former WBA featherweight champion Derrick Gainer in 1996, a loss which Gainer later avenged via unanimous decision in 1998.

Loss to Bobby Pacquiao
Kelley was then outclassed and KO'd by Bobby Pacquiao. On September 28, 2006, Kelley met Carlos Hernández in the ring. In an upset victory, Kelley put on his best performance in years, dropping Hernandez in the 4th round en route to a UD victory. Hernandez announced his retirement right after this fight.

Kelley was David Díaz's mandatory for the WBC Interim Lightweight Championship, but he lost a close decision to former titlist Manuel Medina.

Life after boxing
Kelley now lives in Las Vegas, Nevada and is currently the co-host on "The Sucker Punch Show" alongside Colin Gates. This is a brand new show by SETAG Management Group. The Sucker Punch Show has interviewed some of the most iconic names in the sport of boxing: Roy Jones Jr, Errol Spence Jr, Andre Ward, Shawn Porter and many others. https://www.setagmanagement.com/the-sucker-punch-show.html

While fighting, Kelley also moonlighted as a color commentator, most notably for HBO.  Kelley was the lead on HBO's short lived KO Nation television show.  The show served as a "hip hop" based  boxing broadcast, and was hosted by Ed Lover.

Professional boxing record

References

External links

World featherweight boxing champions
Living people
Sportspeople from Brooklyn
Boxing commentators
1967 births
African-American boxers
American male boxers
World Boxing Council champions
Super-featherweight boxers
Boxers from New York City
21st-century African-American people
20th-century African-American sportspeople